William Norman Renwick (29 November 1914 – 15 June 1944) was a Scotland international rugby union player, who was killed in World War II at Bolsena.

Rugby Union career

Amateur career

He played for Edinburgh Wanderers and London Scottish FC.

Provincial career

He represented Edinburgh District.

He played for the Scotland Possibles side in their trial match against the Scotland Probables on 15 January 1938.

International career

See also
 List of Scottish rugby union players killed in World War II

References

Sources

 Bath, Richard (ed.) The Scotland Rugby Miscellany (Vision Sports Publishing Ltd, 2007 )
 Massie, Allan A Portrait of Scottish Rugby (Polygon, Edinburgh)

External links
 Player profile on scrum.com
 CWGC entry

1914 births
1944 deaths
Scottish rugby union players
Scotland international rugby union players
British Army personnel killed in World War II
Edinburgh Wanderers RFC players
London Scottish F.C. players
Edinburgh District (rugby union) players
Scotland Possibles players
Royal Horse Artillery officers
Military personnel from Edinburgh
Rugby union players from Edinburgh
Rugby union wings